Ovid Demaris (6 September 1919 – 12 March 1998 as Ovide E. Desmarais) was a native of Biddeford, Maine and an author of books and detective stories. A former United Press correspondent and newspaper reporter, he wrote more than thirty books and hundreds of newspaper articles.  He graduated from College of Idaho in 1948 and Boston University in 1950.  Previous to that, he had served in the United States Army Air Forces.

His most important works were of a historical or biographical nature about the Mafia and other gangland characters. He is most noted for The Last Mafioso, his biography of Jimmy Fratianno, and for The Green Felt Jungle, his exposé on Mafia operations in Las Vegas.

Books

Non-fiction 
1960: Lucky Luciano, Monarch Books
1961: The Lindbergh Kidnapping Case, Monarch
1961: The Dillinger Story
1964: The Green Felt Jungle, Pocket Books, Montreal 1964; written with Ed Reid
1965: The Toughest Customers
1967: Jack Ruby, Da Capo Press, written with Garry Wills
1969: Captive City: Chicago in Chains, Sphere Books Limited
1970: Poso del Mundo: Inside the Mexican–American border, from Tijuana to Matamoros 
1970: America the Violent, Cowles Book Co.
1974: The Lucky Luciano story (The Godfather series), Belmont Tower Books
1974: Dirty Business: The Corporate-Political Money-Power Game, Harper's Magazine Press
1975: The Director. An Oral Biography of J. Edgar Hoover
1977: Brothers in Blood, The International Terrorist Network 
1978: Judith Exner: My Story, Grove Press, with Judith Exner
1980: The Last Mafioso, The Treacherous World of Jimmy Fratianno. Bantam Books 
1986: The Boardwalk Jungle, Bantam Books
1994: J. Edgar Hoover: As They Knew Him, Avalon Publishing Group

Novels 
1957: Ride the Gold Mare
1957: The Hoods Take Over
1958: The Lusting Drive
1959: The Long Night
1959: The Slasher
1960: The Extortioners
1960: The Enforcer
1960: The Gold-Plated Sewer
1961: Candyleg (alternative title: Machine Gun McCain)
1963: The Parasite
1965: The Organization (alternative title: The Contract)
1966: Fatal Mistake
1971: Mason's Women
1972: The Overlord
1973: Legs Diamond
1983: The Vegas Legacy
1988: Ricochet

Films
1958: Gang War - based on the novel The Hoods Take Over
1969: Machine Gun McCain - based on the novel Candyleg

References
Ovid Demaris in the Notable Names Database
Ovid Demaris in IMDB 
Obituary: Ovid E. Demaris Investigative Journalist, Best-Selling Author Portland Press Herald  March 14, 1998
The King of the Glittering 'Jungles': People, Power in Gambling Cities Are Author's Big Game, Los Angeles Times May 22, 1986 

People from Biddeford, Maine
1919 births
1998 deaths
American male journalists
20th-century American journalists
Organized crime memoirists
20th-century American novelists
American male novelists
American investigative journalists
Non-fiction writers about organized crime in the United States
20th-century American male writers
20th-century American non-fiction writers